Skånska Dagbladet is a newspaper based in Malmö, Sweden, that has been in circulation since 1888.

History and profile

Skånska Dagbladet was established in 1888, and its headquarters is in Malmö. The Skånska Dagbladet AB is its publisher. During the initial period the paper had four pages with six columns each. At the beginning of the twentieth century its circulation expanded, being one-twentieth of the entire Swedish daily newspaper circulation. In the first quarter of the century the paper was acquired by the Agrarian Party.

Skånska Dagbladet is close to the Centre Party. The paper is published in tabloid format.

In 2002 Skånska Dagbladet was the eighth best-selling newspaper with a circulation of 43,600 copies. It was the eighth largest newspaper in Sweden in terms of readership in 2009.

References

External links
 

1888 establishments in Sweden
Daily newspapers published in Sweden
Mass media in Malmö
Publications established in 1888
Swedish-language newspapers